Mykola Kornylovych Pymonenko 9 March 1862, near Kyiv, Russian Empire; [now Kyiv, Ukraine]26 March 1912, Kyiv, Russian Empire) was a Ukrainian  realist painter who lived and worked in Kyiv. One of his students was Kazimir Malevich, whose early works were influenced by Pymonenko.

He is best known for his urban and rural genre scenes of farmers, country folk and working-class people.

Biography 
His father was a master iconographer, of Ukrainian descent. After working as his father's assistant, Pymonenko went on to study icon painting at the Kyiv Pechersk Lavra. 

In 1876, Pymonenko's work was seen by Mykola Murashko, one of the founders of the Kyiv Art School, who was impressed by the young artist, and lobbied the school's financial backers to allow him to study there for free. Two years later, Pymonenko enrolled at the school, where he worked with the painters Khariton Platonov, Murashko, and others. He studied there until 1882. After his examination work was sent to the Imperial Academy of Fine Arts in Saint Petersburg in 1881, he received a licence to teach drawing at lower secondary school level, and was able to audit classes at the Academy. He married the daughter of Vladimir Orlovsky, one of his instructors.

From 1882 to 1884 Pymonenko studied at the St Petersburg Academy of Arts. That year, both his poor health (possibly caused by tuberculosis) and a lack of funds caused him to return to Kyiv, where he found work as a drawing teacher at a private school. After the school closed in 1901, he moved to the Kyiv Polytechnic Institute of Emperor Alexander II. From 1906 he taught at the Kyiv Art School, Kazimir Malevich being one of his most notable students.

In 1897, Pymonenko was involved in decorating Kyiv's St Volodymyr's Cathedral and was awarded the Order of Saint Anne for his work there. From 1893 he was a member of the Peredvizhniki, and in 1899 he became a full member of the group, and was named an 'academician' in 1904. He won a gold medal at the Salon in 1909 for his exhibited painting Hopak, now in the Louvre.

Pymonenko died in 1912 after a short illness. He was buried at the Lukyanivka Cemetery. His 1913 posthumous exhibition at the Academy of Arts featured 184 paintings, 419 sketches and 112 pencil drawings. Several of his works have alternate versions, painted years apart.

Reputation
Pymonenko fell out of favour with the Peredvizhniki when one of his paintings, Going Home, was used (apparently without his permission) by the Shustov Vodka Company to promote their  (a type of horilka). He was accused of having become "corrupted" and was forced to sue the company to have the image removed.

In 1905, Pymonenko complained to his friend Lazarevsky: "They (Ukrainians) say that I am a renegade, that I do not love my homeland, that I do not give what is needed that my plots are pale, but that all this is not true, not true." Mykola Golubed waved: “It is clear from those words that Pymonenko was wronged as a citizen, but he was praised as an artist by the critics. Pymonenko was a true link between the painting of Shevchenko and Trutovsky."

Gallery

Notes

References

Sources

Further reading 
 
 
 Volodymyr Orlovskyi (text), Микола Пимоненко (Mykola Pymonenko), images compiled by Olga Zhbankova, edited by Alexander Klimchuk. National Art Museum of Ukraine, and Khmelnitsky: Galereya, 2004 , in Ukrainian.
 Boris Chyp, O.G. Oganesyan, Микола Пимоненко: біографічний роман (Mykola Pymonenko: biographical novel), Vol.59 of "Celebrated Names", Kyiv: Molod' (Youth Publishing), 1983, in Ukrainian.

External links 

 Article by the Daily Art magazine

1862 births
1912 deaths
Artists from Kyiv
Ukrainian genre painters
Painters from the Russian Empire
Russian male painters
Peredvizhniki
19th-century Ukrainian painters
19th-century Ukrainian male artists
Ukrainian male painters
20th-century Ukrainian painters
20th-century Ukrainian male artists